Ondavské Matiašovce is a village and municipality in Vranov nad Topľou District in the Prešov Region of eastern Slovakia.

History
In historical records the village was first mentioned in 1363.

Many families from Ondavské Matiašovce and neighboring villages of Benkovce and Tovarne would migrate from the Slovakia to the United States in the early 20th century. The Dudas family has been researched as a known family to have strong genealogical roots in these three villages. An example would be Michael Dudas (1882-1938), who migrated in the early 20th century to settle in Slovak and Polish neighborhoods of Pittsburgh, Pennsylvania. His wife, Maria, and young child, Paul, would follow shortly after. Migration from villages in Slovakia, like Ondavské Matišsovce, were common around the fall of the Austro-Hungarian Empire. (As researched by Robert J. Dudas)

Geography
The municipality lies at an altitude of 133 metres and covers an area of 10.295 km2. It has a population of about 812 people.

External links
 
http://www.statistics.sk/mosmis/eng/run.html

Villages and municipalities in Vranov nad Topľou District